Abhishek Dhar (born 31 August 1970) is an Indian physicist specialising in statistical physics and condensed matter physics. He is a Professor in the International Centre for Theoretical Sciences, Bangalore.

Education and Career
Dhar obtained his PhD in 1998 from the Department of Theoretical Physics at the Tata Institute of Fundamental Research. His doctoral advisor was Deepak Dhar. He did post-doctoral research at Indian Institute of Science, Raman Research Institute and University of California, Santa Cruz. Dhar then became a faculty member of the Raman Research Institute and later joined the International Centre for Theoretical Sciences.

Research
Dhar works on the theory and applications of statistical physics to study non-equilibrium problems. His research areas include anomalous heat transport in  low dimensional systems and open quantum systems where he made significant contributions in  developing an approach using quantum Langevin equations. Dhar also studies large deviations and fluctuation theorems in transport, foundational aspects of statistical mechanics, the measurement problem in quantum mechanics and models of  active matter.

Awards
For his results in classical and quantum transport in low dimensional systems and contributions to non-equilibrium fluctuation theorems, Dhar was awarded the ICTP prize in 2008 and Shanti Swarup Bhatnagar award for Physical Sciences in 2009. He is a fellow of the Indian Academy of Sciences (2012), the National Academy of Sciences (2018)  and the Indian National Science Academy (2020).

References

1970 births
Living people
Indian condensed matter physicists